Yousuf Khan (5 August 1937 – 1 July 2006) was an Indian footballer who represented India national team at the 1960 Summer Olympics. He was one of only two Indians to have been included in the 1965 Asian All Stars XI. He was also a part of the team which won the 1962 Asian Games.

Khan represented Hyderabad in Santosh Trophy. He received the Arjuna Award in 1966.

Honours

India
Asian Games Gold medal: 1962
AFC Asian Cup runners-up: 1964
Merdeka Tournament runner-up: 1964; third-place: 1965

Individual
AFC Asian All Stars: 1965, 1966
 Arjuna Award: 1966

See also
 Arjuna award recipients among Indian footballers

References

External links
 

1937 births
2006 deaths
Indian Muslims
Indian footballers
India international footballers
Footballers at the 1960 Summer Olympics
1964 AFC Asian Cup players
Olympic footballers of India
Recipients of the Arjuna Award
Footballers at the 1962 Asian Games
Footballers at the 1966 Asian Games
Footballers from Hyderabad, India
Association football midfielders
Asian Games medalists in football
Medalists at the 1962 Asian Games
Asian Games gold medalists for India